Takuya Uemura is a Japanese karateka. He is a two-time gold medalist at the World Karate Championships in the men's team kata event, alongside Ryo Kiyuna and Arata Kinjo. He is also a six-time gold medalist in this event at the Asian Karate Championships.

Achievements

References 

Living people
Year of birth missing (living people)
Place of birth missing (living people)
Japanese male karateka
21st-century Japanese people